Sayed Mohamed (born 23 March 1920) was an Egyptian footballer. He competed in the men's tournament at the 1952 Summer Olympics.

References

External links
 
 

1920 births
Possibly living people
Egyptian footballers
Egypt international footballers
Olympic footballers of Egypt
Footballers at the 1952 Summer Olympics
Place of birth missing
Association football forwards